Mount Moxley is a peak in the Royal Society Range, surmounting the divide between Potter and Wirdnam Glaciers. Mapped by United States Geological Survey (USGS) from ground surveys and Navy air photos. Named by Advisory Committee on Antarctic Names (US-ACAN) in 1963 for Lieutenant (jg) Donald F. Moxley, U.S. Navy, Otter and helicopter pilot with Squadron VX-6 at McMurdo Station in 1960.

Mountains of Victoria Land
Scott Coast